Anania is a genus of moths of the family Crambidae described by Jacob Hübner in 1823.

Species

Anania acutalis (Dognin, 1905)
Anania ademonalis (Walker, 1859)
Anania albeoverbascalis Yamanaka, 1966
Anania alta (Maes, 2005)
Anania amaniensis (Maes, 1997)
Anania amphinephela (Meyrick, 1933)
Anania ankolae (Maes, 1997)
Anania antigastridia (Hampson, 1899)
Anania arenacea (Warren, 1892)
Anania aurea (Butler, 1875)
Anania aureomarginalis (Maes, 2012)
Anania auricinctalis (Hampson, 1918)
Anania austa (Strand, 1918)
Anania bifossata (Hampson, 1918)
Anania bryalis (Hampson, 1918)
Anania camerounensis (Maes, 1997)
Anania caudatella (Dyar, 1912)
Anania cervinalis (Warren, 1892)
Anania chekiangensis (Munroe & Mutuura, 1969)
Anania conisanalis (Hampson, 1918)
Anania contentalis (Schaus, 1912)
Anania coronata (Hufnagel, 1767)
Anania coronatoides (Inoue, 1960)
Anania crocealis (Hübner, 1796)
Anania cuspidata (Zhang, Li & Wang, 2002)
Anania delicatalis (South in Leech & South, 1901)
Anania desistalis (Walker, 1862)
Anania dichroma (Moore, 1888)
Anania egentalis (Christoph, 1881)
Anania elutalis (Kenrick, 1917)
Anania epanthisma (Dyar, 1914)
Anania epicroca (Lower, 1903)
Anania epipaschialis (Hampson, 1912)
Anania explicalis (Dyar, 1914)
Anania extricalis (Guenée, 1854)
Anania federalis (Capps, 1967)
Anania ferruginealis (Warren, 1892)
Anania flava (Maes, 2005)
Anania flavicolor (Munroe & Mutuura, 1968)
Anania flavidecoralis (Munroe & Mutuura, 1969)
Anania flavimacularis (Zhang, Li & Song, 2002)
Anania flavipartalis (Hampson, 1918)
Anania flavomarginalis (Maes, 2005)
Anania fovifera (Hampson, 1913)
Anania funebris (Ström, 1768)
Anania fusalis (Hampson, 1912)
Anania fuscalis (Denis & Schiffermüller, 1775)
Anania fuscobrunnealis (South in Leech & South, 1901)
Anania fuscofulvalis Yamanaka, 2000
Anania glaucostigmalis (Hampson, 1918)
Anania gobini (Maes, 2005)
Anania gracilis (Maes, 2005)
Anania griseofascialis Maes, 2003
Anania hasanensis (Kirpichnikova, 1998)
Anania hortulata (Linnaeus, 1758)
Anania hyalactis (Dognin, 1905)
Anania ieralis (Kaye, 1925)
Anania impunctata (Warren, 1897)
Anania inclusalis (Walker, 1866)
Anania intinctalis (Dyar, 1920)
Anania labeculalis (Hulst, 1886)
Anania lancealis (Denis & Schiffermüller, 1775)
Anania ledereri (Amsel, 1956)
Anania leucocraspia (Hampson, 1899)
Anania leuschneri (Munroe, 1976)
Anania lippensi (Maes, 1997)
Anania lobibasalis (Hampson, 1918)
Anania luctualis (Hübner, 1796)
Anania lutealis (Warren, 1892)
Anania luteorubralis (Caradja, 1916)
Anania lysanderalis (Walker, 1859)
Anania melastictalis (Hampson, 1913)
Anania mesophaealis (Hampson, 1913)
Anania metaleuca (Hampson, 1913)
Anania monospila (Hampson, 1913)
Anania murcialis (Ragonot, 1895)
Anania mysippusalis (Walker, 1859)
Anania nerissalis (Walker, 1859)
Anania nullalis (Guenée, 1854)
Anania oberthuri (Turati, 1913)
Anania obliquata (Moore, 1888)
Anania obtusalis (Yamanaka, 1987)
Anania occidentalis (Munroe & Mutuura, 1969)
Anania ocellalis (Warren, 1892)
Anania ochriscriptalis (Marion & Viette, 1956)
Anania ochrofascialis (Christoph, 1882)
Anania otiosalis (Lederer, 1863)
Anania pata (Strand, 1918)
Anania perflavalis (Hampson, 1913)
Anania perlucidalis (Hübner, 1800–1809)
Anania phaeopastalis (Hampson, 1913)
Anania piperitalis (Hampson, 1913)
Anania plectilis (Grote & Robinson, 1867)
Anania powysae (Maes, 2005)
Anania profusalis (Warren, 1896)
Anania pulverulenta (Warren, 1892)
Anania quebecensis (Munroe, 1954)
Anania recreata (Meyrick, 1938)
Anania rudalis (Zerny, 1939)
Anania ruwenzoriensis (Maes, 1997)
Anania shafferi (Speidel & Hanigk, 1990)
Anania shanxiensis Yang & Landry, 2019
Anania solaris (Caradja, 1938)
Anania stachydalis (Zincken in Germar, E. F., 1821)
Anania subfumalis (Munroe & Mutuura, 1971)
Anania subochralis (Dognin, 1905)
Anania taitensis (Maes, 2005)
Anania teneralis (Caradja, 1939)
Anania tennesseensis Yang in Yang, Landry, Handfield, Zhang, Solis, Handfield, Scholtens, Mutanen, Nuss & Hebert, 2012
Anania terrealis (Treitschke, 1829)
Anania tertialis (Guenée, 1854)
Anania testacealis (Zeller, 1847)
Anania trichoglossa (Meyrick, 1936)
Anania tripartalis (Hampson, 1899)
Anania verbascalis (Denis & Schiffermüller, 1775)
Anania vicinalis (South in Leech & South, 1901)

Former species
Anania gyralis (Hulst, 1886)

References

External links

Pyraustinae
Crambidae genera
Taxa named by Jacob Hübner